This is a list of episodes for the Japanese anime television series, Galaxy Express 999, which aired 113 episodes from 14 September 1978 to 28 March 1981. The television series was based on the manga series created by Leiji Matsumoto. Other episodes were based on stories included in other Matsumoto manga, while others were television originals. A compilation film of the same name was released in 1979.

Presently all 113 episodes are available on DVD in Japan. The streaming website Crunchyroll began streaming an English subtitled version on January 9, 2009. The series is also available for streaming from Funimation Entertainment's website.

Each episode preview ends with the Conductor (acting as the narrator here) stating: "Jikai no Ginga Tetsudō 999 wa [episode title] ni tomarimasu" ("Next stop for Galaxy Express 999: [episode title]").

Episode list

References

External links

Galaxy Express 999